Edinburgh and St Andrews Universities by-election may refer to:
 1873 Edinburgh and St Andrews Universities by-election
 1888 Edinburgh and St Andrews Universities by-election
 1890 Edinburgh and St Andrews Universities by-election
 1896 Edinburgh and St Andrews Universities by-election
 1900 Edinburgh and St Andrews Universities by-election
 1916 Edinburgh and St Andrews Universities by-election
 1917 Edinburgh and St Andrews Universities by-election

See also 
 Edinburgh and St Andrews Universities (UK Parliament constituency)